The River Alun is a small river in northwest Pembrokeshire, Wales, which rises near Tretio Common and flows southwestwards to St Davids to empty into St Bride's Bay at the rocky inlet of Porth Clais.

References 

Alun